Betting can refer to:

Places
 Betting, Moselle, a commune in France

Wagering
 Betting in poker
 Gambling
 Sports betting

See also